Alīna Skļemenova (born 15 March 2004) is a Latvian footballer who plays as a goalkeeper for Super Nova and the Latvia national team.

International career
Skļemenova made her debut for the Latvia national team on 30 November 2021, coming on as a half-time substitute for Laura Siņutkina against England and conceding 12 goals in a record 20–0 defeat.

References

2004 births
Living people
Women's association football goalkeepers
Latvian women's footballers
Latvia women's international footballers